Kangongo (1.093 m above sea level) is a settlement on the Eastern banks of the Okavango River in the Kavango East Region, Namibia, 156 km east of Rundu along the Trans-Caprivi Highway. Kangongo has a population of around 5000 inhabitants.

History
The history of Kangongo is closely linked with the history of the Hambukushu people, the easternmost of the five kingdoms of the Kavango people. 
Since independence of Namibia in 1990, Kangongo has gained very little investments, despite abundant agricultural, forestry, labour opportunities in the area. Kangongo is the main village and surrounded by various hamlets such as Shadithiki to the north east, Tjwatama and Shandhimbo to the south east, Ndarata in the Centre, Shakashondo to the west and Sharukuya to the north west, Teya in the South-Center, and Sharuhenga in the Far-South. The first primary school was established by the Roman Catholic missionaries and the historic building still stands where the school was housed. Kangongo also had a station for contract workers who were destined to work in South African mines. These workers were recruited from various villages but had to embark their journey to South Africa via Botswana from Kangongo.

Economy 
Compared to many other Villages in Namibia, Kangongo is still underdeveloped. Like many Villages in Northern Namibia, Kangongo lacks infrastructure and basic services. The economy of Kangongo is characterized by subsistence farmers, with very little general services i.e. school, a small clinic and three shops.
The village boasts a stones Crusher as a primary source of employment opportunities in the village. The crusher is currently owned by Gecko Namibia (Pty) Ltd. Kangongo also has a fish farm run by a cooperative comprises members drawn from the Kangongo community. At present the fish farm needs re-investment in terms of infrastructure and capital for it to operate optimally.

Schools 
 Kangongo Combined School
The school has Grade 0 up to Grade 9 and also cater for the communities in the surrounding villages apart from Kangongo itself. The school has a Board that oversee governance matters. Kangongo Combined School has grown from the primary school which was introduced by the missionaries to where it is now today to be called a Combined School. This school historical has produced learners that are currently contributing to the development of Namibia in general and Kangongo in particular.

Health: Hospitals/ Clinics
 Kangongo Clinic

Sports and Recreation 
The village's main sports club is called Kango Western Tops. It has both football and netball sides. 

Kangongo boasts several feeder clubs within the village. They are commonly known as "sub-teams within the village". All these feeder clubs have football and netball sides.

The Kangongo Sub-Teams are:

New Action SC (Tjwatama, Kangongo)
Juventus SC (Ndarata, Kangongo)
Kango Chiefs SC (Shakashondo, Kangongo)
Makore Cosmos SC (Teya, Kangongo)
Blue Waters SC (Rukuro, Kangongo)
Kango Legends SC (Legends, Kangongo)

Twin Villages – Sister Towns
Kangongo is twinned with:

 Divundu, Namibia
 Nieuwegein, Netherlands
 Gudhjem, Denmark

References

Populated places in Kavango East
Villages in Namibia